The 1990 AFC Youth Championship was held in Jakarta, Indonesia in 1990. The tournament was won by for the seventh time by Korea Republic in the final against North Korea.

Qualification

Qualified teams
  (Hosts)
  (Group 1 winners)
  (Group 2 winners)
  (Group 3 winners)
  (Group 4 winners)
  (Group 5 winners)
  (Group 6 winners)
  (Group 7 winners)

Group stage

Group A

Group B

Knockout stage

Semifinal

Third-place match

Final

Winner

 South Korea, North Korea, Syria qualified for 1991 FIFA World Youth Championship. South Korea and North Korea entered a unified team in the World Cup.

References 

 
AFC U-19 Championship
International association football competitions hosted by Indonesia
Youth
Youth
1990 in youth association football